Rahimabad-e Olya (also Romanized as Raḩīmābād-e ‘Olyā) is a village in Chaqa Narges Rural District, Mahidasht District, Kermanshah County, Kermanshah Province, Iran. At the 2006 census, its population was 170, in 39 families.

References 

Populated places in Kermanshah County